The Anatomy of the Ship series of books are comprehensive treatments of the design and construction of individual ships. They have been published by Conway Maritime Press (now Conway Publishing) since the 1980s, and republished in the US by the Naval Institute Press.

About the series 

Each volume begins with a general history of the vessel, as preface to a set of detailed scale drawings showing every part of the interior and exterior, from keel to masthead. Black-and-white photographs and engravings, including of ship models for older types, round out the description.  Since 1998, each volume has carried a large-scale plan on the reverse of the fold-off dust jacket.

According to its producers, the series ‘aims to provide the finest documentation of individual ships and ship types ever published.  What makes the series unique is a complete set of superbly executed line drawings, both the conventional type of plan as well as explanatory views, with fully descriptive keys.  These are supported by technical details and a record of the ship’s service.’

Classification 

The series is divided into two distinct – yet broadly encompassing – categories, identified by colour coding.  Firstly, those presented in a yellow-and-silver themed dust jacket relate to ‘non-motor-propelled’ ships.  This group tracks the development of ship design from The Ships of Christopher Columbus, through to the end of the age of sail (those designed or constructed approximately up until the 1860s), such as the HMS Beagle: Survey Ship Extraordinaire, 1820–70, by Karl Heinz Marquardt.

Ships thereafter, powered by steam and screw propulsion, are represented in silver-and-blue themed dust jackets.  These include submarines, the Japanese World War II vessel, The Battleship Yamato, by Janusz Skulski, and The Aircraft Carrier Victorious, by Ross Watton.

Index

References 

Books of naval history
Series of non-fiction books
Maritime history magazines